Lannon is a surname. Notable people with that name include:
Frances Lannon (born 1945), British historian
James Patrick Lannon (1878-1953), American admiral
Nyles Lannon, American musician
Ryan Lannon (born 1982), American ice hockey player
Timothy R. Lannon (born 1952), American university president
Alex Lannon, fictional character in Dominion